Gene Phillips (born October 25, 1948) is a former professional basketball player. Phillips played college basketball for the SMU Mustangs and played professionally for the Dallas Chaparrals from 1971–1972.

Biography
Phillips was born in Livingston, Texas. He attended Jones High School in Houston, Texas.

Career
Phillips played for the Dallas Chaparrals of the American Basketball Association (ABA). Previously, he had been drafted by the Milwaukee Bucks in the seventh round of the 1971 NBA draft.

He played at the collegiate level at Southern Methodist University.

References

1948 births
Living people
American men's basketball players
Basketball players from Houston
Dallas Chaparrals players
Milwaukee Bucks draft picks
People from Livingston, Texas
Shooting guards
SMU Mustangs men's basketball players